Chief Rabbi Dr. Warren Goldstein (born 1971) is the Chief Rabbi of The Union of Orthodox Synagogues of South Africa since 2005. Born in Pretoria, he currently lives in Johannesburg. He is the first Chief Rabbi of South Africa who was born in South Africa and the youngest person ever to be appointed to that post, at age 32.

Biography

Education
The Chief Rabbi studied at the Yeshivah Gedolah of Johannesburg for more than fifteen years, where he received his rabbinic ordination from Rabbi Azriel Chaim Goldfein; he additionally qualified as a dayan through the   Eretz Hemda Institute in Jerusalem. He has a BA, LLB (Unisa), and a PhD. in Human Rights and Constitutional Law (Wits).

While practising as a rabbi he completed his PhD at the University of the Witwatersrand Law School. His PhD thesis compared western and Jewish law and was published as a book entitled Defending the Human Spirit: Jewish Law's Vision for a Moral Society. Rabbi Goldstein's thesis is that Talmudic law was ahead of its time in terms of political rights, women's rights, criminal law and poverty alleviation. "I see Western laws as coming round full circle to positions always held by Talmudic law."

Service
Rabbi Goldstein had a number of rabbinic positions before being appointed Chief Rabbi in December 2003. He assumed the full role in January 2005.

Chief Rabbi
Due to his young age, Rabbi Goldstein's election "startled" many people in South Africa.

He was appointed by the Union of Orthodox Synagogues on the recommendation of a selection committee made up of leaders of all the Jewish communal organisations. Chief Rabbi Cyril Harris supported his appointment and, until he fell ill, he helped train Rabbi Goldstein into his new position. Because of his illness, Rabbi Harris was not able to attend the inauguration of his successor but sent a message to be read out. In it, he said: "Rabbi Goldstein is known as a Master of Torah, a Doctor of Laws, and a fierce campaigner on behalf of the vulnerable. His appointment is most welcome. Moreover, amid the turmoils of South African life, it promises entrenched stability."

At his official induction as Chief Rabbi of South Africa on 3 April 2005, Rabbi Goldstein and those in attendance were addressed by South Africa's President Thabo Mbeki:

We salute Rabbi Goldstein as a true South African patriot...Rabbi Goldstein champions the very values which government would like to instil in our society. Civil society, including religious leaders, has a crucial role to play in South Africa today. By their personal example, and through the wisdom of their teachings, religious leaders such as Chief Rabbi Goldstein, can imbue our country with values of honesty, compassion and self-discipline that are so vital in establishing a truly just and moral society.

"Indeed, we are blessed to have a Chief Rabbi who is a formidable Torah scholar whose doctorate is in human rights and constitutional law, including that of our own Constitution."

Areas of focus

Leadership
Engaging with government on issues affecting South Africa and the South African Jewish community. Rabbi Goldstein initiated the 'Enriching Tomorrow - sharing ideas for the future' public speaking forum in which debate and sharing of views occur on the highest level. At these events, the chief rabbi has held public meeting with President Jacob Zuma, Graça Machel, Dr Mamphela Ramphele and Reverend Frank Chikane, to name but a few.

Bill of Responsibilities
Rabbi Goldstein heads a project on behalf of the National Religious Leaders Forum and in partnership with the Department of Education to establish a Bill of Responsibilities for schools across South Africa with the aim of educating and motivating a new generation of South Africans in the values of responsibility, compassion and dignity, among others.

CAP
He is also the co-founder and co-chairman of the Community Active Protection (CAP) organisation which is a community based anti-crime initiative currently protecting at least 150,000 people in the city of Johannesburg and which has brought down contact crime between 80% and 90% in the areas in which it operates.

School Talmud learning
The Chief Rabbi has established a new Beit Midrash learning programme at the Linksfield and Victory Park King David Schools, and at the Herzlia high schools. The programme - which has hundreds of students enrolled in it - aims to empower and inspire the students with the knowledge and appreciation for text-based Torah learning.

Interfaith relationships
Sitting on the executive of the National Religious Leaders Forum, Rabbi Goldstein engages with leaders of all faith communities on a regular basis. The forum hopes to achieve "poverty alleviation" and bring about "moral regeneration" in South Africa.

Opinions

Israel
The chief rabbi is a vocal defender of Israel and has published many articles in the local and international press making, presenting arguments which support the Israeli side of the conflict.

Social issues
He is a regular contributor to print, radio and television on a variety of issues pertaining to "moral regeneration", crime, education, poverty alleviation and religious values in a modern society.

The website www.chiefrabbi.co.za, hosts regular podcasts, video blogs, published articles and it covers a wide range of his opinions.

Trembling Before G-d is a 2001 American documentary film about gay and lesbian Orthodox Jews trying to reconcile their sexuality with their faith. The film was screened in parts of South Africa in 2005. Goldstein described the film as "intellectually shallow," commenting that "its one-sided caricature of Orthodox Judaism does not stimulate meaningful intellectual debate."

Following a deadly confrontation at the Lonmin mine between striking miners and police in August 2012, Goldstein participated in the visit of the delegation from the National Inter-faith Council of South Africa to Marikana, the site of the clash, to offer condolences and support to the community.

Publications

References

External links
Chief Rabbi of South Africa - Official website
S. Africa Makes Bold Chief Rabbi Choice
Inaugural address by President Thabo Mbeki in honor of Rabbi Goldstein

1971 births
21st-century rabbis
Chief rabbis of South Africa
Jews and Judaism in South Africa
Living people
People from Pretoria
Rabbis of Ohr Somayach
South African Orthodox rabbis